Black Theatre Workshop (BTW) is a non-profit theater company based in Montreal and is one of the oldest Black English-speaking professional theatre companies in the Canada. It was established by Clarence Bayne and Arthur Goddard, who previously also founded the Trinidad and Tobago association. The Black Theatre Workshop is known for featuring many prominent artistic directors over the years.

History

Black Theatre Workshop was incorporated in 1971 after its official beginnings in February 1970, and has roots going back to the Drama Committee of the Trinidad and Tobago Association. The Drama Committee was launched by, among others, Clarence Bayne and Arthur Goddard, both of whom were the founders of the Trinidad and Tobago Association, and wrote its first Constitution and by-laws. Bayne and others of the group of Trinidad students at McGill and Sir George Williams University invited a number of professional black Trinidadian artists from Montreal in the late 1960s to conduct Black workshops as part of the activities of the Drama Committee.  

BTW's first professional play, How Now Black Man by McGill University Professor Lorris Elliott, was produced under the auspices of the Trinidad and Tobago Association. Dr. Bayne was appointed by the Trinidad and Tobago Association to be the Executive Producer of that production and to represent the Association's interest, except for a brief absence from the company between 1970 and1972. Dr. Bayne continued to hold the position of Executive producer and president for the formative years of the company, between 1973-4 to 1990. He negotiated the first professional grant from Canada Council with matching funds from the Multicultural Directorate (Ottawa) that launched the company as a professional theatre company in 1984, making it eligible for funding from all three levels of the cultural funding agencies.  Black Theatre Workshop is an English-speaking theatre company. Its first play "How Now Black Man" was produced in 1970 under the name Black Workshop at the Centaur Theatre, but Black Theatre Workshop de facto existed on July 17,1968. 

Over the years,  the theatre has had many artistic directors, including Dr. Clarence Bayne, Errol Sitahal, Terry Donald, Dwight Bacquie, Lorena Gale, Don Jordan, Winston Sutton, Fleurette Fernando, Nancy Delva, Kate Bligh, and Rachael Van Fossen, and Tyrone Benskin. Since August 2011, the Artistic Director has been Quincy Armorer. He is a graduate of the Theatre Department at Concordia University and also studied at the Birmingham Conservatory for Classical Theatre at the Stratford Festival.

Awards and merits

 Walter Borden, (Tightrope Time: Ain’t Nuthin’ More Than Some Itty Bitty Madness Between Twilight and Dawn), one of the first plays in the history of Black Canadian literature to directly present themes of male homosexuality.
 Djanet Sears (The Adventures of a Black Girl in Search of God, Afrika Solo, Harlem Duet).
 Some emerging playwrights as well including Omari Newton (Sal Capone: The Lamentable Tragedy of), Anne-Marie Woods (She Said/He Said), Chimwemwe Miller (When Elephant was King) Djennie Laguerre (Rendez-Vous with Home).

Gallery

Dr. Martin Luther King Jr. Achievement Award

Since 1986, the theatre has given out the annual Dr. Martin Luther King Jr. Achievement Award, presented to an individual who has made a significant contribution to African-Canadian artistic and cultural life in Canada. BTW presents the gala each year to celebrate the contributions of Dr. Martin Luther King to non-violent social change.

BTW presents an award for lifetime achievement, among recipients honorees include: Recipients of the Dr. Martin Luther King Jr. Achievement Award – In 1987, the 1st Vision Celebration Gala was given to Oscar Peterson: Music. In 1988, Ranee Lee: Music / Actor [Jazz]. 1989, Charlie Biddle: Music [Jazz]. 1990, Rufus Rockhead (posthumously): Music [Jazz]. 1991, Dr. Dorothy Wills: Community / Arts. 1992, Dr. Clarence Bayne: Theatre & Educator. 1993, Oliver Jones: Music [Pianist]. 1994, Professor Trevor Payne: Music. 1995, Dr. Daisy Peterson Sweeney: Music. 1996, Salome Bey: Music / Actor. 1997, Lorraine Klaasen: Music [Singer]. 1998, Anthony Sherwood: Actor. 1999, Austin Clarke: Writer. 2000, Michelle Sweeney: Music [Singer]. 2001, Aldwin Albino: Music. 2002, Anthony Salah I. Wilson: Music [Steel pan]. 2003, Djanet Sears: Theatre. 2004, George Elliot Clarke: Poet. 2005, Jeri Brown:  Music [Jazz]. 2006, Walter Borden:  Theatre. 2007, Charles Ellison: Music [Jazz]. 2008, Terry Donald: Theatre. 2009, Ethel Bruneau: Dance [Tap]. 2010, Bertrand A. Henry: Theatre. 2011, Doudou Boicel: Music. 2012, Tonya Lee Williams: Film & Television. 2013, Gregory Charles: Music. 2014. Zab Maboungou: Dance. 2015, Dany Laferrière: Literature. 2016, Jackie Richardson: Theatre & Music. 2017, Winston Sutton: Theatre, Don Jordan: Dance & Theatre, 2018.

In 2005, BTW was recognized by the Dr. Martin Luther King Jr. Legacy Committee of Montreal for its Historic Contribution to the Development of Black Performing Arts in Canada. It has also received a Trail Blazer Award (Black History Month Round Table Award).

References

External links
 Black Theatre Workshop website
 "Black Theatre Workshop," Canadian Theatre.
 Clarence S. Bayne fonds (R4192) at Library and Archives Canada. The fonds includes some files on the Black Theatre Workshop.

Theatre companies in Quebec
Black theatre
Black Canadian culture in Quebec
Canadian theatre awards
Theatre in Montreal
Black Canadian organizations